Odia diaspora are people of Odia ancestry residing outside the Indian state of Odisha. Most Odia people are from Northern, Western,  Central and Coastal Odisha.

Odias in Indian states outside Odisha
Migration from Odisha has a long history. Odia merchants had historical trade links with other parts of India. In modern times, Odias started migrating to different parts of India mainly for education and jobs.

There are various social and cultural organizations in various parts of the country which include Pravasi Odia Vikas Samiti (POVS), Odia Cultural Association which is a group of Odias in Delhi (based in Haryana), the Odia Association Of Delhi (which owns the Jagannath Temple) and Odia Mahasangram.
There is an Odia association at Varanasi, Uttar Pradesh named as Varanaseya Utkal Samaj having long history of more than six decades of existence which is instrumental in bringing together the Odia people and culture within and beyond the Odia community living around the holy city of Varanasi.

The NRO community has honoured Jyoti Kullu, captain of India women's national field hockey team in 2007, on her achievement of the Arjuna Award. The Delhi Odia Lawyer Association awarded the Trophy. She was honoured in a brief function held at the residence of Mr.Jual Oram M.P. and National Vice President of BJP at Delhi. Oram and his wife Jhingia Oram garlanded Jyoti and congratulated her for her success in the field of sports.

Geographic distribution 
Although the total Odia population is unclear, 2001 Census of India puts the population of Odisha at around 36 million. There are smaller Odia communities in the neighbouring states of West Bengal, Jharkhand and Chhattisgarh. Most Odias in West Bengal live in the districts of Midnapore and Bankura. Surat in Gujarat also has a large Odia population, primarily diamond workers in the southern district of Ganjam. Bengaluru and Hyderabad have sizable Odia population due to an IT boom in late 2000s. Some Odias have migrated to Bangladesh where they are known as Bonaz community.

While the southern part of the state has inter migration within the country, the northern part of the state has migration towards the middle east and the Western world. Balasore and cuttack are known as immigration centers of Odisha. Most of the Odia population abroad originates predominantly from the northern district of Balasore followed by Cuttack and Bhadrak. The migrants who work within the country predominantly originate from Ganjam and Puri districts.

While most American Odias prior to 1980 came from Balasore, Sambalpur and Cuttack, increased demand for software engineers and adoption have brought Odias from other areas.

Migration to the United Kingdom has been recorded since 1935, where mostly people from Balasore in undivided Bengal province went to work to United Kingdom and thereafter continuing a chain migration very predominant then, and continues to this day. Most British Odias have obtained British citizenship.

In the late 2000s many Odias, predominantly from Balasore and Cuttack, went to the US East coast to study and to work. This resulted in chain migration, predominantly from Balasore and Cuttack.
 
During 2009 construction boom in Saudi Arabia, the UAE and Qatar, Odias predominantly from Balasore, Bhadrak and Cuttack migrated to the area to earn high salaries in the IT and construction sectors.

International organizations
There are various Odia organizations serving the diaspora in Canada, The United Kingdom, The United States, Singapore and other countries such as: The Odisha Society of Canada, The Odisha Society of the UK (OSUK), The Odisha Society Of the Americas (OSA) and the Norway Odia Community, the Odia Society Of Singapore (OSS) and Pravasi Odia Vikas Samiti (POVS).

Other organizations safeguarding Odia culture abroad include the Shri Jagannath Temple Trust, Canada.

Beside these country-level organizations, there has been attempts to unite all the NROs residing abroad to connect via various online communities. Pravasi Odia is one such online community. Additionally, the virtual Global Odia Mahotsav 2020 event took place in co-operation with multiple Odia organizations, with the aim of advancing international co-operation and development in Odisha.

Non-Resident Odia Facilitation Center
The Non Resident Odia Facilitation Center is an organization that works in liaison with the Government Of Odisha. The Society takes the form of a Public-Private-People-Partnership and shall have representation of the government, Non-Resident Odias (henceforth called NROs) and Community. The "Society" shall take the form of a Public-Private-People-Partnership and shall have representation of the government, NROs and Community.

Notable people
 Jogesh Pati - American theoretical physicist
 Ashok Das - American physicist
 Bhakta B. Rath - American material physicist
 Ellora Patnaik - Canadian actress
 Lisa Mishra - American singer
 Anshuman Rath - Hong Kong cricketer
 Ritwik Behera - American cricketer

See also
 Bonaz, Odia Bangladeshis
 Jagannath Temple (Puri)
 Jagannath Temple, Delhi
 Jagannath Temple, Hyderabad
 Shri Jagannath Puri Temple
 The Odisha Society of the Americas

Notes

References

External links
 Sustainable Economic and Educational Development Society (SEEDS)

Odia
People from Odisha